Lalin Jirasinha (born 23 June 1958) is a former Sri Lankan male sailor. He competed at the Summer Olympics on two occasions - in 1984 Summer Olympics held in Los Angeles at the age of 26 and later after 16 years, again he participated at the event in 2000 Summer Olympics which was held in Sydney at the age of 42. During the 1984 Summer Olympics, he was the flagbearer for Sri Lanka.

Jirasinha has also participated at the  Asian Games in 1998 and in the 2002 Asian Games. At the 1998 Asian Games, he won the bronze medal in the sailing - Enterprise event.

References

External links
 

1958 births
Living people
Asian Games bronze medalists for Sri Lanka
Sailors at the 1984 Summer Olympics – 470
Sailors at the 2000 Summer Olympics – Finn
Medalists at the 1998 Asian Games
Sailors at the 1998 Asian Games
Sailors at the 2002 Asian Games
Olympic sailors of Sri Lanka
Sri Lankan male sailors (sport)
Asian Games medalists in sailing